The 2020–21 Eastern Illinois Panthers men's basketball team represented Eastern Illinois University in the 2020–21 NCAA Division I men's basketball season. The Panthers, led by ninth-year head coach Jay Spoonhour, played their home games at Lantz Arena in Charleston, Illinois as members of the Ohio Valley Conference. They finished the season 9–18, 6–14 in OVC play to finish in a tie for ninth place. They failed to qualify for the OVC Tournament.

On March 4, 2021, the school announced that they would not renew head coach Jay Spoonhour's contract. Nearly a month later, the school named Clemson assistant and former Evansville head coach Marty Simmons the team's new head coach.

Previous season
The Panthers finished the 2019–20 season 17–15, 9–9 in OVC play to finish in a tie for fifth place. They defeated Jacksonville State in the first round of the OVC tournament, before losing in the quarterfinals to Austin Peay.

Roster

Schedule and results 

|-
!colspan=12 style=| Non-conference regular season

|-
!colspan=9 style=| Ohio Valley regular season

|-

Sources

References

Eastern Illinois Panthers men's basketball seasons
Eastern Illinois Panthers
Eastern Illinois Panthers men's basketball
Eastern Illinois Panthers men's basketball